Robert du Preez may refer to:
 Robert du Preez (rugby union, born 1963), born 1963, a South African rugby union coach and former South Africa national rugby union international
 Robert du Preez (rugby union, born 1993), born 1993, a South African rugby union player